Michael Ennis is an Irish Gaelic footballer who plays for his local club Ballinagore and for the Westmeath county team. He was part of the team who lined out against Laois in the 2004 Leinster Senior Football Championship Final to claim the County's first ever Leinster trophy.

Honours
Ballinagore
Leinster Junior Club Football Championship (1): 2005
Westmeath Intermediate Football Championship (1): 2007
Westmeath Junior Football Championship (1): 2005

Westmeath
Leinster Senior Football Championship (1): 2004
National Football League, Division 2 (3): 2001, 2003, 2008
All-Ireland Under-21 Football Championship (1): 1999
Leinster Under-21 Football Championship (2): 1999, 2000

Leinster
Railway Cup (2): 2005, 2006

References

Year of birth missing (living people)
Living people
Ballinagore Gaelic footballers
Westmeath inter-county Gaelic footballers